Ardor or Ardour may refer to:

 Ardor (album), a 1994 album by Love Spirals Downwards
 Ardour (album), a 2010 album by instrumental hip hop/electronica producer Teebs
 Ardor (film), a 2002 South Korean film, also known as Milae
 Ardour (software), a hard disk recorder and digital audio workstation application
 Ardour (river), a river in southwestern France
 Ardore, a town in Calabria, Italy
 Ardor: The Book of the Dead Man, Vol. 2, a book of poems by Marvin Bell
 Ada or Ardor: A Family Chronicle, a novel by Vladimir Nabokov

See also
 Ardent (disambiguation)
 Passion (emotion), very strong feeling